Minister for Heritage may refer to:

 Minister for Heritage (New South Wales), Australia
 Minister for Heritage (Western Australia), Australia

See also

 Minister for Culture and the Preservation of Historical and Cultural Heritage of Abkhazia
 Minister for Tourism and Culture (Northern Territory), Australia
 Minister of Canadian Heritage
 Minister of Culture, Heritage, Tourism and Sport (Manitoba), Canada
 Jerusalem Affairs and Heritage Minister of Israel
 Ministry of Cultural Heritage and Activities (Italy)
 Minister for Arts, Culture and Heritage, New Zealand
 Ministry for Culture and Heritage, New Zealand
 Ministry of Heritage and Culture, Oman
 Ministry of Culture and National Heritage (Poland)
 Ministry of National Heritage, Sri Lanka
 Secretary of State for National Heritage, United Kingdom
 Minister for Tourism and Heritage, United Kingdom